The University of Calcutta, which is located in Kolkata, West Bengal is one of the oldest and most renowned educational institutions in South Asia. It was established in 1857. There are several colleges and institutes that are affiliated to this university. At present there are approximately 160 institutes which comes under this university, which are mostly located in the districts of Kolkata, Howrah, Hooghly, and South 24 Parganas.

List of affiliated centres 
This is the list of centres:

 A. K. Choudhury School of Information Technology
 Women's Studies Research Centre
 Gandhian Studies Centre
 Centre for Urban Economic Studies
 S. K. Mitra Centre for Space Environment
 Peace Studies Research Centre
 Centre for Testing and Training for Providing Technical Back up to the Beneficiaries for Agricultural and Horticultural Development
 USIC
 Centre for Horticultural Studies
 CPEPA-UGC center for “Electrophysiology & Neuro-Imaging studies including Mathematical Modeling”

 Centre for Millimeter Wave Semiconductor Devices & Systems
 Centre for Pakistan and West Asian Studies
 Centre for Research in Nanoscience and Nanotechnology
 Centre for Social Sciences and Humanities
 Centre for South and Southeast Asian Studies
 Centre for Studies in Book Publishing
 Nehru Studies Centre
 Centre for the Study of Social Exclusion and Inclusive Policy
 Institute of Foreign Policy Studies
 Centre for Pollination Studies
 University of Calcutta – Calcutta Stock Exchange Centre of Excellence in Financial Markets
 S N Pradhan Centre for Neurosciences

References

External links 

 

University of Calcutta
Lists of universities and colleges in West Bengal